A.C. Perugia were relegated from Serie A with a bang, following a chaotic season, in which president Luciano Gaucci managed to upset the Italian football society, by claiming that the referees' were deliberately trying to relegate Perugia to Serie B. Prior to the season, he performed a PR-stunt, when signing Libyan leader Muammar Gaddafi's son Al-Saadi Gaddafi He also continued trying to sign female players, trying to sign both Hanna Ljungberg and Victoria Svensson, according to Swedish daily Aftonbladet.

In the same paper, Ancona goalkeeper Magnus Hedman accused his team mates for throwing away the final match of the season, in which Perugia won 1-0. That victory qualified Perugia for the relegation playoffs against Fiorentina, where Enrico Fantini scored in both matches for Fiorentina, ensuring Perugia was being relegated, only one year before the club folded.

The list of players representing the club during the season included 35 players, which meant the team drastically changed from game to game.

Squad

Goalkeepers
  Željko Kalac
  Michele Tardioli
  Stefano Pardini

Defenders
  Zé Maria
  Marco Di Loreto
  Souleymane Diamoutene
  Giovanni Ignoffo
  Fabio Grosso
  Fabiano
  Salvatore Fresi
  Ferdinand Coly
  Konstantinos Loumpoutis
  Evangelos Nastos
  Jamal Alioui
  Roberto Cardinale

Midfielders
  Christian Obodo
  Fabio Gatti
  Massimiliano Fusani
  Giovanni Tedesco
  Guilherme do Prado
  Eusebio Di Francesco
  Paul Codrea
  Christian Manfredini
  Gaël Genevier
  Al-Saadi Gaddafi

Attackers
  Jay Bothroyd
  Massimo Margiotta
  Fabrizio Ravanelli
  Dario Hübner
  Franco Brienza
  Zisis Vryzas
  Emanuele Berrettoni
  Marcelo Zalayeta
  Luigi Giandomenico
  Francesco Zerbini
  Gabriele Scandurra

Serie A

Matches

 Perugia-Siena 2-2
 1-0 Zisis Vryzas (10)
 1-1 Andrea Ardito (19)
 2-1 Jay Bothroyd (27)
 2-2 Rodrigo Taddei (48)
 Parma-Perugia 3-0
 1-0 Mark Bresciano (26)
 2-0 Adriano (49 pen)
 3-0 Alberto Gilardino (82)
 Perugia-Milan 1-1
 0-1 Gennaro Gattuso (19)
 1-1 Zisis Vryzas (31)
 Chievo-Perugia 4-1
 1-0 Andrea Zanchetta (40)
 1-1 Marco Di Loreto (50)
 2-1 Andrea Zanchetta (52 pen)
 3-1 Franco Semioli (66)
 4-1 Mario Alberto Santana (81)
 Perugia-Reggina 0-0
 Bologna-Perugia 2-2
 0-1 Fausto Rossini (49 og)
 0-2 Jay Bothroyd (69)
 1-2 Samuele Dalla Bona (71)
 2-2 Fausto Rossini (78)
 Perugia-Udinese 3-3
 0-1 Dino Fava (36)
 1-1 Marco Di Loreto (42)
 2-1 Jay Bothroyd (44)
 2-2 Dino Fava (62)
 2-3 Dino Fava (77)
 3-3 Massimo Margiotta (89)
 Modena-Perugia 1-0
 1-0 Riccardo Allegretti (50)
 Perugia-Lecce 2-2
 0-1 Javier Chevantón (7)
 1-1 Massimo Margiotta (45 + 2)
 1-2 Cristian Ledesma (66)
 2-2 Fabio Grosso (82)
 Lazio-Perugia 3-1
 1-0 Dejan Stanković (45 + 2)
 1-1 Fabio Grosso (62)
 2-1 Bernardo Corradi (87)
 3-1 Simone Inzaghi (90 + 4)
 Perugia-Empoli 1-1
 0-1 Tommaso Rocchi (3)
 1-1 Zisis Vryzas (40)
 Inter-Perugia 2-1
 1-0 Christian Vieri (25)
 2-0 Christian Vieri (80)
 2-1 Giovanni Tedesco (89)
 Perugia-Sampdoria 3-3
 0-1 Francesco Flachi (16)
 1-1 Giovanni Ignoffo (38)
 2-1 Massimo Margiotta (55)
 3-1 Giovanni Tedesco (58)
 3-2 Michele Tardioli (60 og)
 3-3 Francesco Flachi (89)
 Perugia-Brescia 2-2
 1-0 Massimo Margiotta (5)
 1-1 Luigi Di Biagio (10)
 2-1 Dario Dainelli (72 og)
 2-2 Antonio Filippini (77)
 Juventus-Perugia 1-0
 1-0 Pavel Nedvěd (29)
 Perugia-Roma 0-1
 0-1 Mancini (3)
 Ancona-Perugia 0-0
 Siena-Perugia 2-1
 0-1 Fabrizio Ravanelli (5)
 1-1 Tore André Flo (87)
 2-1 Fernando Menegazzo (90 + 2)
 Perugia-Parma 2-2
 1-0 Dario Hübner (8)
 1-1 Alberto Gilardino (35)
 1-2 Domenico Morfeo (38)
 2-2 Zé Maria (42)
 Perugia-Chievo 0-2
 0-1 Andrea Barzagli (67)
 0-2 Federico Cossato (90 + 7)
 Reggina-Perugia 1-2
 0-1 Zé Maria (22)
 1-1 Francesco Cozza (53 pen)
 1-2 Dario Hübner (90 + 2)
 Perugia-Bologna 4-2
 1-0 Fabrizio Ravanelli (32)
 1-1 Claudio Bellucci (61)
 2-1 Paul Codrea (68)
 3-1 Zé Maria (75)
 4-1 Salvatore Fresi (83 pen)
 4-2 Claudio Bellucci (85)
 Udinese-Perugia 1-1
 1-0 Vincenzo Iaquinta (46)
 1-1 Marco Di Loreto (56)
 Perugia-Modena 1-1
 0-1 Fabio Vignaroli (18)
 1-1 Zé Maria (75 pen)
 Lecce-Perugia 1-2
 0-1 Franco Brienza (14)
 0-2 Marco Di Loreto (60)
 1-2 Wilfried Dalmat (86)
 Perugia-Lazio 1-2
 0-1 Stefano Fiore (29)
 1-1 Franco Brienza (49)
 1-2 Giuliano Giannichedda (58)
 Empoli-Perugia 1-0
 1-0 Tommaso Rocchi (64)
 Perugia-Inter 2-3
 0-1 Adriano (24)
 1-1 Eusebio Di Francesco (50)
 2-1 Dario Hübner (58)
 2-2 Adriano (86)
 2-3 Obafemi Martins (88)
 Sampdoria-Perugia 3-2
 1-0 Aimo Diana (38)
 2-0 Francesco Flachi (44)
 2-1 Zé Maria (46)
 2-2 Fabrizio Ravanelli (84)
 3-2 Francesco Flachi (87)
 Brescia-Perugia 1-1
 0-1 Fabrizio Ravanelli (38)
 1-1 Roberto Baggio (45 + 1)
 Perugia-Juventus 1-0
 1-0 Fabrizio Ravanelli (49)
 Roma-Perugia 1-3
 1-0 Antonio Cassano (12)
 1-1 Zé Maria (18)
 1-2 Zé Maria (24 pen)
 1-3 Fabrizio Ravanelli (83)
 Perugia-Ancona 1-0
 1-0 Jay Bothroyd (64)

Relegation Playoffs

Fiorentina were promoted to 2004–05 Serie A; Perugia were relegated to 2004–05 Serie B.

Topscorers
  Zé Maria 7 
  Jay Bothroyd 4
  Fabrizio Ravanelli 4
  Massimo Margiotta 4
  Zisis Vryzas 3

References

Sources
  RSSSF - Italy 2003/04

A.C. Perugia Calcio seasons
Perugia